The 2010–11 Indonesia Super League (also known as Djarum Indonesia Super League for sponsorship reasons) was the third season of the Indonesia Super League, a fully professional football competition that replaced the Premier Division as the top-tier of football competition in the country. The competition began on 26 September 2010 and ended on 19 June 2011.

The league was won by Persipura Jayapura, who finished with an eight-point lead over runners-up and 2009–10 champions Arema Malang.

Teams 
Persik Kediri, Persebaya Surabaya and Persitara Jakarta Utara were relegated at the end of the 2009–10 season after finishing in the bottom three places of the table. They were replaced by the best three teams from the 2009–10 Liga Indonesia Premier Division, Persibo Bojonegoro, Deltras Sidoarjo and Semen Padang.

Pelita Jaya Karawang retained their Super League spot after winning the relegation/promotion play-off against fourth-placed Premier Division sides Persiram Raja Ampat by 4–2 on penalties; the score after 120 minutes was 1–1.

Stadia and locations

Personnel and kits 

Note: Flags indicate national team as has been defined under FIFA eligibility rules. Players and Managers may hold more than one non-FIFA nationality.

 Nike produced a new match ball, named the T90 Tracer.

Managerial changes

League table

Results

Promotion/relegation play-off 

NB:
(O) = Play-off winner; (P) = Promoted to Indonesia Super League; (R) = Relegated to Indonesian Premier Division.

2011 Indonesia Super League All-Star game

Season statistics

Top goal scorers 
Including matches played on 8 May 2011

Hat-tricks 

 4 : Player scored 4 goals

Scoring 

 First goal of the season: Edward Wilson Junior for Semen Padang against Persipura Jayapura (26 September 2010)
 Quickest goal of the season: 43 seconds – Saktiawan Sinaga for Semen Padang against Persela Lamongan (8 January 2011)
 Widest winning margin: 8 goals
 Arema Indonesia 8–0 Bontang (19 June 2011)
 Highest scoring game: 9 goals
 Persipura Jayapura 8–1 Bontang (20 October 2010)
 Persija Jakarta 7–2 Persisam Putra Samarinda (23 April 2011)
 Most goals scored in a match by a single team: 8 goals
 Persipura Jayapura 8–1 Bontang (20 October 2010)
 Arema Indonesia 8–0 Bontang (19 June 2011)
 Fewest games failed to score in: 3 – Persipura Jayapura
 Most games failed to score in: 12 – Deltras Sidoarjo

Clean sheets 
 Most clean sheets: 13 – Arema FC
 Fewest clean sheets: 1 – Bontang FC

Attendance

See also 
 2011 Indonesia Super League All-Star Game

References 

 
Top level Indonesian football league seasons
Indonesia Super League seasons
Indonesia
1